Guillermo García-López and Mariano Hood were the defending champions; however, they chose to not participate this year.
Rubén Ramírez Hidalgo and Santiago Ventura won in the final 6–4, 7–6(5), against Michael Kohlmann and Philipp Marx.

Seeds

Draw

Draw

References
 Doubles draw

Rabat,Doubles
2009,Doubles